"Realize/Take a Chance" is the sixth single by melody. under the Toy's Factory label. It was released August 17, 2005. The single stayed on the Oricon for 14 weeks and peaked at number 6. To date, the single has sold 127,869 copies. This is melody.'s best-selling single. It was used as the theme song for the drama Dragon Zakura.

Track listing
 Realize (3:45)
 Take a Chance (4:23)
 Next to You (Fredisco Remix) (5:44)
 Realize (instrumental) (3:45)
 Take a Chance (instrumental) (4:23)

Melody (Japanese singer) songs
Japanese television drama theme songs
2005 songs
2005 singles
Toy's Factory singles